The Journal of Genetic Psychology: Research and Theory on Human Development is a quarterly peer-reviewed scientific journal covering developmental psychology. The first scholarly journal devoted to the field of developmental psychology, it was established in 1891 by G. Stanley Hall as The Pedagogical Seminary, and was renamed The Pedagogical Seminary and Journal of Genetic Psychology in 1924. In 1954, the journal obtained its current name. It is published by Taylor & Francis and the editor-in-chief is Bradford H Pillow (Northern Illinois University).

References

External links

Publications established in 1891
Quarterly journals
Developmental psychology journals
Taylor & Francis academic journals
English-language journals